This was the 12th time India participating in the Commonwealth Games. India ranked 7th in the medal tally.

Medalists

Gold medalists

Silver medalists

Bronze medalists

Cricket
India entered The national cricket team. 

 NR means No result.

References

Nations at the 1998 Commonwealth Games
India at the Commonwealth Games
1998 in Indian sport